The Đại Việt National Socialist Party (Chữ Nôm: 大越國家社会党) was a political party founded in 1936 in Vietnam in the Hội Phục Việt (with Vietnam Patriotic Party and Annam Nationalist Party), following nationalism, inspired by the Kenpeitai.

History
Đại Việt National Socialist Party was founded by Nguyễn Xuân Tiếu, with Trần Trọng Kim as General Secretary, and was a force with about 2,000 members, exerting influence in big cities such as Hanoi and Haiphong during that time World War II. This was a pro-Japanese political organization that supported the establishment of the Empire of Vietnam.

This was a group of the northern branch of the Vietnam Restoration Allied Society (Việt Nam Phục quốc Đồng minh Hội), the southern branch was the pro-Japanese branch of Nationalist Party of Greater Vietnam, and associated with pro-Japanese groups in the Daiviet National League (Đại Việt Quốc gia Liên minh).

Dissolution
Three days after the declaration of independence on September 2, 1945, the Provisional Government of the Democratic Republic of Vietnam ordered the dissolution of Đại Việt National Socialist Party, accusing it of conspiring to conduct harmful activities independent background. Đại Việt National Socialist Party was accused of aiding foreign countries to endanger independence.

See also
 Daiviet National League

References

 Hà Thúc Ký. Sống còn với Dân tộc. ?: Phương Nghi, 2009.
 Hoang, Van Dao. Viet Nam Quoc Dan Dang, A Contemporary History of National Struggle: 1927-1954. Pittsburgh, PA: RoseDog Books, 2008.
 Shiraishi Masaya(白石昌也). "The Vietnamese Phuc Quoc League and the 1940 Insurrection". Tokyo: Contemporary Asian Studies, Waseda University, 2004.
 Trúc Sĩ. "Cái chết của Trần Chủ soái và 27 nghĩa quân". Miền Bắc khai nguyên. Glendale, CA: ? tái xuất bản tại Hải ngoại.
 Kỳ Ngoại Hầu Cường Để và Việt Nam Phục quốc Đồng minh Hội 

Defunct political parties in Vietnam
Organizations established in 1936